Gorilla Adventure is a 1969 children's book by the Canadian-born American author Willard Price featuring his "Adventure" series characters, Hal and Roger Hunt. It depicts an expedition to capture a giant mountain gorilla for a circus.

The location was post-colonial Congo. As usual, the greatest danger posed to the brothers, and to the animals, came not from the wild beasts but in the form of humans.  The two main primary antagonists were: one inept, boastful but cowardly Belgian (Andre Tieg) who passes himself off as a guide, and a poacher of gorillas, called Nero, whose primary method was to slaughter all adults and take the young gorillas.

In the midst of the dangers, Roger becomes temporarily blinded by a spitting cobra. One villager refers to a gorilla as a 'man who can't speak' in a reference to gorilla intelligence.

The safari team are complete in this adventure.

Other persons
 A doctor in the field hospital who performs surgery on Gog. Gog was shot by Tieg
 Two diamond searchers. Gog holds Hal's hand and eye to eye contact ensures that Gog knows the truth.

Animals captured

Novels by Willard Price
1969 American novels
Novels set in the Democratic Republic of the Congo
Gorillas
1969 children's books
John Day Company books